is a Japanese voice actress. She is affiliated with Ken-On.

Biography
Kitagawa made her debut anime role for Gatchaman Crowds. She voiced Yuuko Omori/Cure Honey in HappinessCharge PreCure!.

Filmography

Anime
HappinessCharge Precure – Yuko Omori/Cure Honey
Keijo!!!!!!!! – Saya Kogatana
Blood Blockade Battlefront – Angelica
Precure All Stars Movie: Haru no Carnival♪ – Yuko Omori/Cure Honey
Ore Monogatari!! – Nanako Yamazaki,Mio
Dragon Ball Super – Brianne de Chateau, Ribrianne
Brotherhood: Final Fantasy XV – Lunafreya Nox Fleuret
Chieri to Cherry – Shouta
Orange – Female student, Male student, Marie
Detective Conan – Koyuki Ujisato
Tamayomi – Ryō Kawasaki

Films
HappinessCharge PreCure! the Movie: The Ballerina of the Land of Dolls – Yuko Omori/Cure Honey
A Whisker Away – Yumi Hinode

Video games
Sengoku X
Final Fantasy XV – Lunafreya Nox Fleuret, Mysterious Voice (DLC)
Yokai Hyakkitan – Fenghuang,Sansei
Bara ni Kakusareshi Verite – Marie Antoinette
Medarot Girls Mission – Kokushou Sayuri
Food Fantasy (2018) – Sushi, Tiramisu, Milk
Disgaea 7 – Seefour

Dubbing
All of Us Are Dead, Jang Ha-ri (Ha Seung-ri)
All We Had, Ruthie Carmichael (Stefania LaVie Owen)
The Mule, Ginny (Taissa Farmiga)
Shane (New Era Movies edition), Marian Starrett (Jean Arthur)

References

External links
 Official blog 
 Official agency profile 
 

1993 births
Living people
Voice actresses from Yokohama
Japanese video game actresses
Japanese voice actresses
Ken-On artists